Piezophidion is a genus of beetles in the family Cerambycidae, containing the following species:

 Piezophidion bordoni Martins, 2005
 Piezophidion intricatum Galileo & Martins, 1992
 Piezophidion punctatum Martins, 2005
 Piezophidion simplex Martins, 2005
 Piezophidion thoracicum Martins, Galileo & de-Oliveira, 2009

References

Elaphidiini